In mathematics, a natural bundle is any fiber bundle associated to the s-frame bundle  for some . It turns out that its transition functions depend functionally on local changes of coordinates in the base manifold  together with their partial derivatives up to order at most . 

The concept of a natural bundle was introduced by Albert Nijenhuis as a modern reformulation of the classical concept of an arbitrary bundle of geometric objects.

An example of natural bundle (of first order) is the tangent bundle  of a manifold .

Notes

References
 
 
 

Differential geometry
Manifolds
Fiber bundles